Events in the year 2021 in the Dominican Republic.

Incumbents
 President: Luis Abinader (starting 2020)
 Vice President: Raquel Peña de Antuña (starting 2020)

Events
January 6 – The government condemns violence in the 2021 storming of the United States Capitol.
February 27 – The government says it will fence the border between the DR and Haiti in order to curb migration and other illegal activities.

Deaths
January 7 – Norberto James Rawlings, 75, poet; complications from Parkinson's disease.
January 8 – , 97, military officer, Head of the Armed Forces (1966-1971, 1972-1975, 1978).
January 10 – Pedro González, 83, baseball player (New York Yankees, Cleveland Indians).
January 20 – Juan Bautista Sánchez Peralta (″Juanchy″), 64, part owner of Águilas Cibaeñas baseball team; COVID-19 (b. 1956).
February 15 – Johnny Pacheco, 85, musician (Fania All-Stars) and label executive (Fania Records), complications from pneumonia.
March 23 – Hugo Cabrera, 67, basketball player; pancreatic cancer.
April 6 – Jack Veneno, 78, professional wrestler (WWC) and politician; pancreatic cancer.

See also

COVID-19 pandemic in the Dominican Republic
2021 in the Caribbean
2021 Atlantic hurricane season

References

External links

 
2020s in the Dominican Republic
Years of the 21st century in the Dominican Republic
Dominican Republic
Dominican Republic